The Cambodia national futsal team represents Cambodia in international futsal and is administered by the Football Federation of Cambodia.

Tournament

FIFA Futsal World Cup

AFC Futsal Championship

AFF Futsal Championship

Players

Current squad 
The following 14 players were called up for the 2022 AFF Futsal Championship in Thailand on 2–10 April 2022.

References

Asian national futsal teams
National sports teams of Cambodia